Angluzelles-et-Courcelles is a commune in the Marne department in northeastern France.

Geography 
Angluzelles-et-Courcelles is in the south-west of the Marne department. It is 45 km north of Troyes and 75 km south of Reims. It is composed of Angluzelles in the west, and Courcelles in the east. The commune is bordered by the communes of Marigny, Thaas, Faux-Fresnay, Corroy, Ognes, and Pleurs.

Politics

Population

See also
Communes of the Marne department

References

Communes of Marne (department)